This is an almanac of seasons played by HFX Wanderers FC in the Canadian Premier League (CPL) and other soccer competitions, from HFX's inaugural CPL campaign in 2019 to the present day. It also includes club and individual honours and records for the team. It is updated once yearly near the end of the calendar year, and friendly matches and competitions are excluded.

Key
Key to competitions

 Canadian Premier League (CPL) – The top-flight of soccer in Canada, established in 2019.
 Canadian Championship (CC) – The premier knockout cup competition in Canadian soccer, first contested in 2008.
 CONCACAF Champions League (CCL) – The premier competition in North American soccer since 1962. It went by the name of Champions' Cup until 2008.
 CONCACAF League (CL) – The second-tier of continental competition in North American soccer since 2017.

Key to colors and symbols

Key to league record
 Season = The year and article of the season
 Div = Level on pyramid
 League = League name
 Pld = Played
 W = Games won
 L = Games lost
 D = Games drawn
 GF = Goals scored
 GA = Goals against
 Pts = Points
 PPG = Points per game
 Pos. = League position

Key to cup record
 DNE = Did not enter
 DNQ = Did not qualify
 NH = Competition not held or canceled
 QR = Qualifying round
 PR = Preliminary round
 GS = Group stage
 R1 = First round
 R2 = Second round
 R3 = Third round
 R4 = Fourth round
 R5 = Fifth round
 QF = Quarterfinals
 SF = Semifinals
 RU = Runners-up
 W = Winners

Overview

1. Average attendance include statistics from league matches only.
2. Top goalscorer(s) includes all goals scored in league season, league playoffs, Canadian Championship, CONCACAF League, and other competitive continental matches.

Year-by-year statistics

Club honours

None

Individual honours

Golden Boot: Akeem Garcia (2020)
Coach of the Year: Stephen Hart (2020)

Club records

Wins

 Biggest CPL win – 2–0 (vs. Valour FC, June 26, 2019), and one other occasion
 Biggest Canadian Championship win – 2–0 (at Valour FC, June 12, 2019) 
 Biggest Continental win – N/A

Losses and draws

 Biggest CPL loss – 0–5 (vs Pacific FC, September 15, 2020)
 Biggest Canadian Championship loss – 2–3 (vs. Ottawa Fury FC, July 10, 2019) 
 Biggest Continental loss – N/A
 Highest scoring draw in all competitions – 2–2 (at Ottawa Fury FC, July 24, 2019), and one other occasion

Attack

 Most goals scored in a CPL match – 3 goals (vs. FC Edmonton, August 26, 2020)
 Most goals scored in a Canadian Championship match – 3 goals (at Vaughan Azzurri, May 15, 2019) 
 Most goals scored in a Continental match – N/A

Defence

 Most clean sheets in a CPL season – 8 (2019) 
 Most goals conceded in a CPL match – 6 goals (at York9 FC, July 27, 2019) 
 Most goals conceded in a Canadian Championship match – 3 goals (vs. Ottawa Fury FC, July 10, 2019) 
 Most goals conceded in a Continental match – N/A

Firsts (all competitions)

 First player signed – November 29, 2018 ( Zachary Sukunda) 
 First club captain – April 28, 2018 ( Jan-Michael Williams) 
 First competitive match – April 28, 2019 (0-1 loss at Pacific FC in CPL)
 First competitive win – May 4, 2019 (2-1 win vs. Forge FC) in CPL)
 First competitive clean sheet – June 12, 2019 (2-0 win vs. Valour FC in Canadian Championship by Jan-Michael Williams)
 First competitive goal – May 4, 2019 (in the 30th minute vs. Forge FC in CPL by Akeem Garcia) 
 First competitive brace – N/A
 First competitive hat-trick – N/A

Sequences (all competitions)

 Wins – 3 (June 1, 2019 to June 12, 2019)
 Draws – 6 (September 2, 2019 to October 2, 2019)
 Losses – 4 (July 10, 2019 to July 20, 2019)
 Matches unbeaten – 4 (May 29, 2019 to June 12, 2019
 Matches winless – 10 (August 10, 2019 to October 9, 2019)
 Clean sheets – 2 (August 5, 2019 to August 10, 2019)
 Minutes without conceding – 270 minutes (July 31, 2019 to August 28, 2019)

Attendance

 Highest attendance – 6244 (vs. Pacific FC, CPL, June 1, 2019) 
 Highest CPL attendance – 6244 (vs. Pacific FC, June 1, 2019) 
 Lowest attendance – 3854 (vs. Valour FC, Canadian Championship, June 5, 2019) 
  Lowest CPL attendance – 5387 (vs. Valour FC, May 29, 2019)

Transfers

 Highest (known) transfer fee paid – N/A
 Highest (known) transfer fee received – N/A

International caps

This is a list of players who have gained full international caps during their time with HFX.

Individual records

Appearances

 Youngest player –  Adisa De Rosario, 17 years 11 months 13 days (vs. Forge FC, CPL, October 9, 2022) 
 Oldest player –  Jan-Michael Williams, 34 years 11 months 10 days (at Cavalry FC, CPL, October 5, 2019) 

Bold indicates player still active with club.

Goals

 Most goals in a season –  João Morelli, 14 in 2021
 Most goals in a match –  João Morelli, 2 v FC Edmonton, Canadian Premier League, August 26, 2020) 
 Fastest goal in a match –  Tomasz Skublak, 2nd minute (at Vaughan Azzurri, Canadian Championship, May 15, 2019) 
 Youngest goalscorer –  Samuel Salter, 20 years 11 months 8 days (v Cavalry FC, Canadian Premier League, July 17, 2021) 
 Oldest goalscorer –  Luis Alberto Perea, 33 years 1 month 6 days (v Pacific FC, CPL, October 9, 2019) 

Bold indicates player still active with club.

Assists

 Most assists in a season –  Mohamed Kourouma, 4 in 2019 &  Zachary Fernandez, 4 in 2022

Bold indicates player still active with club.

Clean sheets

 Most clean sheets in a season –  Christian Oxner, 6 in 2019
 Youngest keeper to record a clean sheet –  Kieran Baskett, 19 years 11 months 22 days (vs. York United FC, CPL, September 18, 2021) 
 Oldest keeper to record a clean sheet –  Jan-Michael Williams, 34 years 8 months 11 days (vs. York 9 FC, CPL, July 6, 2019)

References

External links 

records
Canadian soccer club statistics